Horwood, Lovacott and Newton Tracey is a civil parish in North Devon district, Devon, England. In the 2011 census it was recorded as having a population of 487. It includes the villages of Horwood and Newton Tracey and the hamlet of Lovacott.

The parish was formed as Newton Tracey in 1986 from the former civil parishes of Horwood and Newton Tracey and the Lovacott ward of Fremington parish, and adopted its current name in 1991. The neighbouring parishes are Fremington to the north; Tawstock to the east; Yarnscombe (in Torridge district) to the south east; Alverdiscott (Torridge district) to the south; Westleigh and Instow to the west.

There are 40 listed buildings in the parish. The Church of St Michael in Horwood is Grade I listed; the Church of St Thomas of Canterbury in Newton Tracey and Hoopers Cottage in Horwood (a house dated c.1600) are Grade II*, and the remaining houses, gravestones, and farm buildings are Grade II.

The two Anglican parish churches are in the Diocese of Exeter.

Horwood And Newton Tracey Community Primary School serves the area and is located at Lovacott. It was built in 1876, but there has been a school in Lovacott for two centuries. The school has about 90 pupils.

References

External links

    

 Horwood: historical and genealogical information at GENUKI
 Newton Tracey: historical and genealogical information at GENUKI

Civil parishes in Devon
North Devon